"P Power" (stylized as "P power") is a song by American rapper Gunna featuring Canadian rapper Drake. It was planned to appear on Gunna's third studio album DS4Ever (2022), but its release was delayed due to sample clearance issues. The song was later released on January 13, 2022 as an extra addition to the album. It was produced by Metro Boomin.

Background
On January 5, 2022, Gunna revealed the tracklist of his album DS4Ever, which included the song "Pussy Power". However, when the album was released two days later, "Pussy Power" was notably missing from the record. It was finally released on January 13 as "P Power", on an extended version of DS4Ever. In an interview with Complex, Gunna revealed that the delay occurred because of sample clearance issues. He said, "I originally sampled Donna Summer. I don't even know her, because I'm so young. But she was a legend and her estate couldn't get back in time for my album."

Composition
The song contains a sample of Donna Summer's cover of "Could It Be Magic" by Barry Manilow. Lyrically, Gunna and Drake detail their "drug-driven moments" and "escapades" with women, as well as buying them expensive items due to their lifestyles of luxury. The song also features moans from a woman in the background along with the instrumental.

Charts

Weekly charts

Year-end charts

Certifications

References

2022 songs
Gunna (rapper) songs
Drake (musician) songs
Song recordings produced by Metro Boomin
Songs written by Gunna (rapper)
Songs written by Drake (musician)
Songs written by Metro Boomin
Songs written by Barry Manilow